Nikulino is the name of several rural localities in Russia:
Nikulino, Dobryansky District, Perm Krai, a selo in Dobryansky District, Perm Krai
Nikulino, Permsky District, Perm Krai, a village in Permsky District, Perm Krai